Donald Douglas (born Douglas William Kinleyside, 24 August 1905 – 31 December 1945) was a Scottish actor in the United States who performed in films, on the stage and in radio.

Background
 
He was born in Edinburgh, Scotland, 24 August 1905, and was christened at a church in Twickenham, England. Young Douglas was the son of William Young Kinleyside, a businessman and lawyer. Business brought his father to New York on several occasions, and eventually, five-year old Douglas, with his sister Hazel, were brought to America as second cabin class passengers, on board the British steamer Mauritania, which sailed from the Port of Liverpool on 29 October 1910, and arrived at the Port of New York, 4 November. He became an American citizen in 1939. Adopting the stage name "Don Douglas", he became a singer and actor in musical shows such as Footlites. In 1928, his big break came when he won glowing revues for his performance in The Desert Song in the Orpheum Theatre in Chicago. This would eventually lead to his career in talking pictures.

Film
Douglas appeared in over 100 films from the late 1920s to the 1940s including The Great Gabbo (1929), Life Begins (1932), Men in White (1934), Madame X (1937), Cheers for Miss Bishop (1941), Now, Voyager (1942), Little Tokyo, U.S.A. (1942), Tall in the Saddle (1944), Murder, My Sweet (1944) and Show Business (1944). One of his more prominent roles was also one of his last: In Gilda (1946), he plays the man who pretends to marry Rita Hayworth but is really a henchman of Glenn Ford's character.

Radio
Douglas was a one-man cast on The Black Castle. He played all roles in each episode and was the announcer. A review of The Black Castle in the trade publication Billboard complimented Douglas's handling of multiple roles in the drama. Bob Francis wrote: "Except for the fact that he is inclined to ham the wizard, making the role often seem more silly than awesome, Douglas puts on a good 15 minutes. His vocal changes are sharp and clear, and his characterizations come over effectively."

He also had the title role in John Steele, Adventurer and played Chief Jake Workley in Scattergood Baines. He was also a member of the cast of Kelly's Courthouse.

Death
Douglas died on 31 December 1945 in Los Angeles, California, aged 40, after emergency surgery for a ruptured appendix. He is interred in the Forest Lawn Memorial Park Cemetery in Glendale, California.

Partial filmography

 The Great Gabbo (1929) - Frank
 Tonight at Twelve (1929) - Tom Stoddard
 Life Begins (1932) - Medical Student in a Business Suit (uncredited)
 He Couldn't Take It (1933) - Oakley
 You Can't Buy Everything (1934) - Intern at Clinic (uncredited)
 A Woman's Man (1934) - Walter Payson - Horseback Rider
 Lazy River (1934) - Officer (uncredited)
 Men in White (1934) - Mac
 Operator 13 (1934) - Confederate Officer (uncredited)
 Tomorrow's Children (1934) - Dr. Brooks
 Transatlantic Merry-Go-Round (1934) - Purser (uncredited)
 Sequoia (1934) - (uncredited)
 Night Life of the Gods (1935) - Mr. Martin (uncredited)
 Bad Guy (1937) - Electrical Instructor (uncredited)
 The Women Men Marry (1937) - Auctioneer Mc Vey (uncredited)
 Madame X (1937) - Mr. Edison - Yacht Officer (uncredited)
 Navy Blue and Gold (1937) - Lt. North (uncredited)
 Headin' East (1937) - Eric Ward
 Manhattan Shakedown (1937) - Hadley Brown
 Special Inspector (1938) - Williams
 Judge Hardy's Children (1938) - J.J. Harper (uncredited)
 Test Pilot (1938) - Pilot in Cafe (uncredited)
 Alexander's Ragtime Band (1938) - Singer (scenes deleted)
 Fast Company (1938) - Lt. James Flanner
 The Crowd Roars (1938) - Murray
 Smashing the Rackets (1938) - Harry Spaulding
 The Gladiator (1938) - Coach Robbins
 Convicted (1938) - District Attorney
 The Night Hawk (1938) - Tom Niles (uncredited)
 The Spider's Web (1938, Serial) - Jenkins (the Butler)
 Law of the Texan (1938) - Chet Hackett
 Orphans of the Street (1938) - Colonel Daniels
 Pacific Liner (1939) - Ship's Officer (uncredited)
 The Mysterious Miss X (1939) - Clarence Fredericks
 Jesse James (1939) - Infantry Captain (uncredited)
 Wings of the Navy (1939) - Officer of the Day
 Fast and Loose (1939) - Forbes
 Within the Law (1939) - Inspector Burke
 Sergeant Madden (1939) - Al Boylan, Sr. (scenes deleted)
 The Man Who Dared (1939) - Mr. Miller (uncredited)
 Mr. Moto in Danger Island (1939) - Ship's Officer - Fight Referee (uncredited)
 The Zero Hour (1939) - Brewster
 Second Fiddle (1939) - Film Director (uncredited)
 Stronger Than Desire (1939) - Mack Clark - Flagg's Investigator (uncredited)
 The House of Fear (1939) - John Woodford
 Fugitive at Large (1939) - Stevens
 Sabotage (1939) - Joe Grayson
 Smashing the Money Ring (1939) - Gordon (uncredited)
 On Dress Parade (1939) - Col. Wm. Duncan
 Calling Philo Vance (1940) - Philip Wrede
 Charlie Chan in Panama (1940) - Captain Lewis
 Dr. Kildare's Strange Case (1940) - Mr. Grayson, Patient losing Eye Sight (uncredited)
 Edison, the Man (1940) - Jordan (uncredited)
 Island of Doomed Men (1940) - Department of Justice Official (uncredited)
 A Fugitive from Justice (1940) - Lee Leslie
 Queen of the Mob (1940) - Second FBI Director (uncredited)
 Deadwood Dick (1940, Serial) - Dick Stanley - aka Deadwood Dick
 I Love You Again (1940) - Herbert
 Gallant Sons (1940) - Hackberry
 Flight Command (1940) - 1st Duty Officer
 Cheers for Miss Bishop (1941) - Delbert Thompson
 Andy Hardy's Private Secretary (1941) - Mr. J.O. Harper (uncredited)
 Murder Among Friends (1941) - Joe Ellis
 Sleepers West (1941) - Tom Linscott
 Dead Men Tell (1941) - Jed Thomasson
 A Shot in the Dark (1941) - Roger Armstrong
 The Great Swindle (1941) - Bill Farrow
 The Get-Away (1941) - Jim Duff
 Sergeant York (1941) - Captain Tillman (uncredited)
 Whistling in the Dark (1941) - Gordon Thomas
 The Pittsburgh Kid (1941) - (uncredited)
 Hold Back the Dawn (1941) - Joe (uncredited)
 Mercy Island (1941) - Clay Foster
 The Night of January 16th (1941) - Attorney Polk
 Melody Lane (1941) - J. Roy Thomas
 The Bugle Sounds (1942) - Mr. Clyde - FBI Agent (uncredited)
 On the Sunny Side (1942) - Mr. George Andrews
 Juke Box Jenny (1942) - Roger Wadsworth
 Little Tokyo, U.S.A. (1942) - Hendricks
 Tales of Manhattan (1942) - 'Hen 'Henderson (Robinson sequence)
 Daring Young Man (1942) - Carl Rankin
 Now, Voyager (1942) - George Weston (uncredited)
 The Crystal Ball (1943) - Mr. Bowman (uncredited)
 The Meanest Man in the World (1943) - Husband (uncredited)
 He's My Guy (1943) - Kirk
 The More the Merrier (1943) - FBI Agent Harding
 Action in the North Atlantic (1943) - Lieutenant Commander (uncredited)
 Appointment in Berlin (1943) - Bill Banning (uncredited)
 Behind the Rising Sun (1943) - Clancy O'Hara
 Wintertime (1943) - Jay Rogers (uncredited)
 The Falcon Out West (1944) - Attorney Steven Hayden
 Show Business (1944) - Charlie Lucas
 Tall in the Saddle (1944) - Harolday
 Heavenly Days (1944) - Dr. George Gallup
 Murder, My Sweet (1944) - Police Lieutenant Randall
 Grissly's Millions (1945) - Ellison Hayes
 A Royal Scandal (1945) - Variatinsky (uncredited)
 Tarzan and the Amazons (1945) - Andres
 Mama Loves Papa (1945) - Secretary (uncredited)
 Club Havana (1945) - Johnny Norton
 The Strange Mr. Gregory (1945) - John Randall
 Tokyo Rose (1946) - Timothy O'Brien
 Gilda (1946) - Thomas Langford
 The Truth About Murder (1946) - Paul Marvin (final film role)

References

External links

1905 births
1945 deaths
Scottish male film actors
Burials at Forest Lawn Memorial Park (Glendale)
20th-century Scottish male actors
British expatriate male actors in the United States
Male actors from Edinburgh